

Events

Pre-1600
 363 – Emperor Julian marches back up the Tigris and burns his fleet of supply ships. During the withdrawal, Roman forces suffer several attacks from the Persians.
 632 – Yazdegerd III ascends the throne as king (shah) of the Persian Empire. He becomes the last ruler of the Sasanian dynasty (modern Iran).
1407 – Ming–Hồ War: Retired King Hồ Quý Ly and his son King Hồ Hán Thương of Hồ dynasty are captured by the Ming armies.
1487 – Battle of Stoke Field: King Henry VII of England defeats the leaders of a Yorkist rebellion in the final engagement of the Wars of the Roses.
1586 – Mary, Queen of Scots, recognizes Philip II of Spain as her heir and successor.

1601–1900
1745 – War of the Austrian Succession: New England colonial troops under the command of William Pepperrell capture the Fortress of Louisbourg in Louisbourg, New France (Old Style date).
1746 – War of the Austrian Succession: Austria and Sardinia defeat a Franco-Spanish army at the Battle of Piacenza.
1755 – French and Indian War: The French surrender Fort Beauséjour to the British, leading to the expulsion of the Acadians.
1760 – French and Indian War: Robert Rogers and his Rangers surprise French held Fort Sainte Thérèse on the Richelieu River near Lake Champlain. The fort is raided and burned.
1779 – Spain declares war on the Kingdom of Great Britain, and the Great Siege of Gibraltar begins.
1795 – French Revolutionary Wars: In what became known as Cornwallis's Retreat, a British Royal Navy squadron led by Vice Admiral William Cornwallis strongly resists a much larger French Navy force and withdraws largely intact, setting up the French Navy defeat at the Battle of Groix six days later.
1811 – Survivors of an attack the previous day by Tla-o-qui-aht on board the Pacific Fur Company's ship Tonquin, intentionally detonate a powder magazine on the ship, destroying it and killing about 100 attackers.
1815 – Battle of Ligny and Battle of Quatre Bras, two days before the Battle of Waterloo.
1824 – A meeting at Old Slaughter's coffee house in London leads to the formation of what is now the Royal Society for the Prevention of Cruelty to Animals (RSPCA).
1836 – The formation of the London Working Men's Association gives rise to the Chartist Movement.
1846 – The Papal conclave of 1846 elects Pope Pius IX, beginning the longest reign in the history of the papacy.
1858 – Abraham Lincoln delivers his House Divided speech in Springfield, Illinois.
1871 – The Universities Tests Act 1871 allows students to enter the universities of Oxford, Cambridge and Durham without religious tests (except for those intending to study theology).
1883 – The Victoria Hall theatre panic in Sunderland, England, kills 183 children.
1884 – The first purpose-built roller coaster, LaMarcus Adna Thompson's "Switchback Railway", opens in New York's Coney Island amusement park.
1897 – A treaty annexing the Republic of Hawaii to the United States is signed; the Republic would not be dissolved until a year later.

1901–present
1903 – The Ford Motor Company is incorporated.
  1903   – Roald Amundsen leaves Oslo, Norway, to commence the first east–west navigation of the Northwest Passage.
1904 – Eugen Schauman assassinates Nikolay Bobrikov, Governor-General of Finland.
  1904   – Irish author James Joyce begins a relationship with Nora Barnacle and subsequently uses the date to set the actions for his novel Ulysses; this date is now traditionally called "Bloomsday".
1911 – IBM founded as the Computing-Tabulating-Recording Company in Endicott, New York.
1922 – General election in the Irish Free State: The pro-Treaty Sinn Féin party wins a large majority.
1925 – Artek, the most famous Young Pioneer camp of the Soviet Union, is established.
1930 – Sovnarkom establishes decree time in the USSR.
1933 – The National Industrial Recovery Act is passed in the United States, allowing businesses to avoid antitrust prosecution if they establish voluntary wage, price, and working condition regulations on an industry-wide basis.
1940 – World War II: Marshal Henri Philippe Pétain becomes Chief of State of Vichy France (Chef de l'État Français).
  1940   – A Communist government is installed in Lithuania.
1944 – In a gross miscarriage of justice, George Junius Stinney Jr., age 14, becomes the youngest person executed in the United States in the 20th century after being convicted in a two-hour trial for the rape and murder of two teenage white girls.
1948 – Members of the Malayan Communist Party kill three British plantation managers in Sungai Siput; in response, British Malaya declares a state of emergency.
1955 – In a futile effort to topple Argentine President Juan Perón, rogue aircraft pilots of the Argentine Navy drop several bombs upon an unarmed crowd demonstrating in favor of Perón in Buenos Aires, killing 364 and injuring at least 800. At the same time on the ground, some soldiers attempt to stage a coup but are suppressed by loyal forces.
1958 – Imre Nagy, Pál Maléter and other leaders of the 1956 Hungarian Uprising are executed.
1961 – While on tour with the Kirov Ballet in Paris, Rudolf Nureyev defects from the Soviet Union.
1963 – Soviet Space Program: Vostok 6 mission: Cosmonaut Valentina Tereshkova becomes the first woman in space.
1963 – In an attempt to resolve the Buddhist crisis in South Vietnam, a Joint Communique was signed between President Ngo Dinh Diem and Buddhist leaders.
1972 – The largest single-site hydroelectric power project in Canada is inaugurated at Churchill Falls Generating Station.
1976 – Soweto uprising: A non-violent march by 15,000 students in Soweto, South Africa, turns into days of rioting when police open fire on the crowd.
1977 – Oracle Corporation is incorporated in Redwood Shores, California, as Software Development Laboratories (SDL), by Larry Ellison, Bob Miner and Ed Oates.
1981 – US President Ronald Reagan awards the Congressional Gold Medal to Ken Taylor, Canada's former ambassador to Iran, for helping six Americans escape from Iran during the hostage crisis of 1979–81; he is the first foreign citizen bestowed the honor.
1989 – Revolutions of 1989: Imre Nagy, the former Hungarian prime minister, is reburied in Budapest following the collapse of Communism in Hungary.
1997 – Fifty people are killed in the Daïat Labguer (M'sila) massacre in Algeria.
2000 – The Secretary-General of the UN reports that Israel has complied with United Nations Security Council Resolution 425, 22 years after its issuance, and completely withdrew from Lebanon. The Resolution does not encompass the Shebaa farms, which is claimed by Israel, Syria and Lebanon.
2002 – Padre Pio is canonized by the Roman Catholic Church.
2010 – Bhutan becomes the first country to institute a total ban on tobacco.
2012 – China successfully launches its Shenzhou 9 spacecraft, carrying three astronauts, including the first female Chinese astronaut Liu Yang, to the Tiangong-1 orbital module.
  2012   – The United States Air Force's robotic Boeing X-37B spaceplane returns to Earth after a classified 469-day orbital mission.
2013 – A multi-day cloudburst, centered on the North Indian state of Uttarakhand, causes devastating floods and landslides, becoming the country's worst natural disaster since the 2004 tsunami.
2015 – American businessman Donald Trump announces his campaign to run for President of the United States in the upcoming election.
2016 – Shanghai Disneyland Park, the first Disney Park in Mainland China, opens to the public.
2019 – Upwards of 2,000,000 people participate in the 2019–20 Hong Kong protests, the largest in Hong Kong's history.

Births

Pre-1600
1139 – Emperor Konoe of Japan (d. 1155)
1332 – Isabella de Coucy, English daughter of Edward III of England (d. 1379)
1454 – Joanna of Aragon, Queen of Naples (d. 1517)
1514 – John Cheke, English academic and politician, English Secretary of State (d. 1557)
1516 – Yang Jisheng, Ming dynasty official and Confucian martyr (d. 1555)
1583 – Axel Oxenstierna, Swedish politician, Lord High Chancellor of Sweden (d. 1654)
1591 – Joseph Solomon Delmedigo, Greek-Italian physician, mathematician, and theorist (d. 1655)

1601–1900
1606 – Arthur Chichester, 1st Earl of Donegall, Irish soldier and politician (d. 1675)
1613 – John Cleveland, English poet and educator (d. 1658)
1625 – Samuel Chappuzeau, French scholar (d. 1701)
1633 – Jean de Thévenot, French linguist and botanist (d. 1667)
1644 – Henrietta Anne Stuart, Princess of Scotland, England and Ireland (d. 1670)
1653 – James Bertie, 1st Earl of Abingdon, English nobleman (d. 1699)
1713 – Meshech Weare, American farmer, lawyer, and politician, 1st Governor of New Hampshire (d. 1786)
1723 – Adam Smith, Scottish philosopher and economist (d. 1790)
1738 – Mary Katherine Goddard, American publisher (d. 1816)
1754 – Salawat Yulayev, Russian poet (d. 1800)
1792 – John Linnell, English painter and engraver (d. 1882)
1801 – Julius Plücker, German mathematician and physicist (d. 1868)
1806 – Edward Davy, English physician and chemist (d. 1885)
1813 – Otto Jahn, German archaeologist and philologist (d. 1869)
1820 – Athanase Josué Coquerel, Dutch-French preacher and theologian (d. 1875)
1821 – Old Tom Morris, Scottish golfer and architect (d. 1908)
1826 – Constantin von Ettingshausen, Austrian geologist and botanist (d. 1897)
1836 – Wesley Merritt, American general and politician, Military Governor of the Philippines (d. 1910)
1837 – Ernst Laas, German philosopher and academic (d. 1885)
1838 – Frederic Archer, English organist, composer, and conductor (d. 1901)
  1838   – Cushman Kellogg Davis, American lieutenant and politician, 7th Governor of Minnesota (d. 1900)
1840 – Ernst Otto Schlick, German engineer and author (d. 1913)
1850 – Max Delbrück, German chemist and academic (d. 1919)
  1850   – William Arnon Henry American academic and agriculturist (d. 1932)
1857 – Arthur Arz von Straußenburg, Austrian-Hungarian general (d. 1935)
1858 – Gustaf V of Sweden (d. 1950)
1863 – Francisco León de la Barra, Mexican politician and diplomat (d. 1939)
1866 – Germanos Karavangelis, Greek-Austrian metropolitan (d. 1935)
1867 – René Seyssaud, Provençal painter (d. 1952)
1874 – Arthur Meighen, Canadian lawyer and politician, 9th Prime Minister of Canada (d. 1960)
1880 – Otto Eisenschiml, Austrian-American chemist and author (d. 1963)
1882 – Mohammad Mosaddegh, Iranian educator and politician, 60th Prime Minister of Iran (d. 1967)
1885 – Erich Jacoby, Estonian-Polish architect (d. 1941)
1888 – Alexander Friedmann, Russian physicist and mathematician (d. 1925)
  1888   – Peter Stoner, American mathematician and astronomer (d. 1980)
1890 – Stan Laurel, English actor and comedian (d. 1965)
1896 – Murray Leinster, American author and screenwriter (d. 1976)
1897 – Georg Wittig, German chemist and academic, Nobel Prize laureate (d. 1987)
1899 – Helen Traubel, American operatic soprano (d. 1972)

1901–present
1902 – Barbara McClintock, American geneticist and academic, Nobel Prize laureate (d. 1992)
  1902   – George Gaylord Simpson, American paleontologist and author (d. 1984)
1906 – Alan Fairfax, Australian cricketer (d. 1955)
1907 – Jack Albertson, American actor (d. 1981)
1909 – Archie Carr, American ecologist and zoologist (d. 1987)
1910 – Juan Velasco Alvarado, Peruvian general and politician, 1st President of Peru (d. 1977)
1912 – Albert Chartier, Canadian illustrator (d. 2004)
  1912   – Enoch Powell, English soldier and politician, Secretary of State for Health (d. 1998)
1914 – Eleanor Sokoloff, American pianist and teacher (d. 2020)
1915 – John Tukey, American mathematician and academic (d. 2000)
  1915   – Marga Faulstich, German glass chemist (d. 1998)
1917 – Phaedon Gizikis, Greek general and politician, President of Greece (d. 1999)
  1917   – Katharine Graham, American publisher (d. 2001)
  1917   – Aurelio Lampredi, Italian automobile and aircraft engine designer (d. 1989)
  1917   – Irving Penn, American photographer (d. 2009)
1920 – Isabelle Holland, Swiss-American author (d. 2002)
  1920   – Raymond Lemieux, Canadian chemist and academic (d. 2002)
  1920   – José López Portillo, Mexican lawyer and politician, 31st President of Mexico (d. 2004)
  1920   – Hemanta Mukherjee, Indian singer and music director (d. 1989)
1922 – Ilmar Kullam, Estonian basketball player and coach (d. 2011)
1923 – Ron Flockhart, Scottish race car driver (d. 1962)
1924 – Faith Domergue, American actress (d. 1999)
1925 – Jean d'Ormesson, French journalist and author (d. 2017)
  1925   – Otto Muehl, Austrian-Portuguese painter and director (d. 2013)
1926 – Efraín Ríos Montt, Guatemalan general and politician, 26th President of Guatemala (d. 2018)
1927 – Tom Graveney, English cricketer and sportscaster (d. 2015)
  1927   – Ya'akov Hodorov, Israeli footballer (d. 2006)
  1927   – Herbert Lichtenfeld, German author and screenwriter (d. 2001)
  1927   – Ariano Suassuna, Brazilian author and playwright (d. 2014)
1929 – Sabah Al-Ahmad Al-Jaber Al-Sabah, Emir of Kuwait (d. 2020)
1930 – Vilmos Zsigmond, Hungarian-American cinematographer and producer (d. 2016)
1934 – Eileen Atkins, English actress and screenwriter
  1934   – Roger Neilson, Canadian ice hockey player and coach (d. 2003)
1935 – Jim Dine, American painter and illustrator
1937 – Simeon Saxe-Coburg-Gotha, Bulgarian politician, 48th Prime Minister of Bulgaria
  1937   – Erich Segal, American author and screenwriter (d. 2010)
1938 – Thomas Boyd-Carpenter, English general
  1938   – Torgny Lindgren, Swedish author and poet (d. 2017)
  1938   – Joyce Carol Oates, American novelist, short story writer, critic, and poet
1939 – Billy "Crash" Craddock, American singer-songwriter
1940 – Māris Čaklais, Latvian poet, writer, and journalist (d. 2003)
  1940   – Neil Goldschmidt, American lawyer and politician, 33rd Governor of Oregon
  1941   – Lamont Dozier, American songwriter and producer (d. 2022)
  1941   – Tommy Horton, English golfer (d. 2017)
  1941   – Mumtaz Hamid Rao, Pakistani journalist (d. 2011)
1942 – Giacomo Agostini, Italian motorcycle racer and manager
  1942   – Eddie Levert, American R&B/soul singer-songwriter, musician, and actor 
1944 – Henri Richelet, French painter and etcher (d. 2020)
1945 – Claire Alexander, Canadian ice hockey player and coach
  1945   – Lucienne Robillard, Canadian social worker and politician, 59th Secretary of State for Canada
1946 – Rick Adelman, American basketball player and coach
  1946   – John Astor, 3rd Baron Astor of Hever, English businessman and politician
  1946   – Karen Dunnell, English statistician and academic
  1946   – Tom Harrell, American trumpet player and composer
  1946   – Neil MacGregor, Scottish historian and curator
  1946   – Iain Matthews, English singer-songwriter and guitarist 
  1946   – Jodi Rell, American politician, 87th Governor of Connecticut
  1946   – Mark Ritts, American actor, puppeteer, and producer (d. 2009)
  1946   – Derek Sanderson, Canadian ice hockey player and sportscaster
  1946   – Simon Williams, English actor and playwright
1947 – Al Cowlings, American football player and actor
  1947   – Tom Malone, American trombonist, composer, and producer 
  1947   – Buddy Roberts, American wrestler (d. 2012)
1948 – Ron LeFlore, American baseball player and manager
1949 – Caju, Brazilian footballer
  1949   – Ralph Mann, American hurdler and author
1950 – Mithun Chakraborty, Indian actor and politician
  1950   – Michel Clair, Canadian lawyer and politician
  1950   – Jerry Petrowski, American politician and farmer
1951 – Charlie Dominici, American singer and guitarist 
  1951   – Roberto Durán, Panamanian boxer
1952 – George Papandreou, Greek sociologist and politician, 182nd Prime Minister of Greece
  1952   – Gino Vannelli, Canadian singer-songwriter
1953 – Valerie Mahaffey, American actress
  1953   – Ian Mosley, English drummer 
1954 – Matthew Saad Muhammad, American boxer and trainer (d. 2014)
  1954   – Garry Roberts, Irish guitarist 
1955 – Grete Faremo, Norwegian politician, Norwegian Minister of Defence
  1955   – Laurie Metcalf, American actress
  1955   – Artemy Troitsky, Russian journalist and critic
1957 – Ian Buchanan, Scottish-American actor
  1957   – Leeona Dorrian, Lady Dorrian, Scottish lawyer and judge
1958 – Darrell Griffith, American basketball player
  1958   – Ulrike Tauber, German swimmer
  1958   – Warren Rodwell, Australian soldier, educator and musician  
1959 – The Ultimate Warrior, American wrestler (d. 2014)
1960 – Peter Sterling, Australian rugby league player and sportscaster
1961 – Can Dündar, Turkish journalist and author
  1961   – Robbie Kerr, Australian cricketer
  1961   – Steve Larmer, Canadian ice hockey player
  1961   – Margus Metstak, Estonian basketball player and coach
1962 – Wally Joyner, American baseball player and coach
  1962   – Arnold Vosloo, South African-American actor
  1962   – Anthony Wong, Hong Kong singer
1963 – The Sandman, American wrestler
1964 – Danny Burstein, American actor and singer
1965 – Michael Richard Lynch, Irish computer scientist and entrepreneur; co-founded HP Autonomy
  1965   – Richard Madaleno, American politician
1966 – Mark Occhilupo, Australian surfer
  1966   – Olivier Roumat, French rugby player
  1966   – Phil Vischer, American voice actor, director, producer, and screenwriter, co-created VeggieTales
  1966   – Jan Železný, Czech javelin thrower and coach
1967 – Charalambos Andreou, Cypriot footballer
  1967   – Jürgen Klopp, German footballer and manager
1968 – Adam Schmitt, American singer-songwriter, musician, and producer 
1969 – Shami Chakrabarti, English lawyer and academic
  1969   – Mark Crossley, English-Welsh footballer and manager
1970 – Younus AlGohar, Pakistani poet and academic, co-founded Messiah Foundation International
  1970   – Clifton Collins Jr., American actor 
  1970   – Cobi Jones, American soccer player and manager
  1970   – Phil Mickelson, American golfer
1971 – Tupac Shakur, American rapper and producer (d. 1996)
1972 – Kiko Loureiro, Brazilian guitarist
  1972   – John Cho, American actor
1973 – Eddie Cibrian, American actor
1974 – Glenicia James, Saint Lucian cricketer
  1974   – Joseph May, British-born Canadian-American actor
1975 – Anthony Carter, American basketball player and coach
1977 – Craig Fitzgibbon, Australian rugby league player and coach
  1977   – Duncan Hames, English accountant and politician
  1977   – Kerry Wood, American baseball player
1978 – Daniel Brühl, Spanish-German actor
  1978   – Dainius Zubrus, Lithuanian ice hockey player
  1978   – Fish Leong, Malaysian singer
1980 – Brandon Armstrong, American basketball player
  1980   – Phil Christophers, German-English rugby player
  1980   – Henry Perenara, New Zealand rugby league player and referee
  1980   – Martin Stranzl, Austrian footballer
  1980   – Joey Yung, Hong Kong singer
1981 – Benjamin Becker, German tennis player
  1981   – Kevin Bieksa, Canadian ice hockey player
  1981   – Alexandre Giroux, Canadian ice hockey player
  1981   – Ola Kvernberg, Norwegian violinist 
  1981   – Miguel Villalta, Peruvian footballer
1982 – May Andersen, Danish model and actress
  1982   – Missy Peregrym, Canadian model and actress
1983 – Armend Dallku, Albanian footballer
1984 – Rick Nash, Canadian ice hockey player
  1984   – Dan Ryckert, American writer and entertainer
  1984   – Steven Whittaker, Scottish footballer
1986 – Rodrigo Defendi, Brazilian footballer
  1986   – Urby Emanuelson, Dutch footballer
  1986   – Fernando Muslera, Uruguayan footballer
1987 – Diana DeGarmo, American singer-songwriter and actress
  1987   – Per Ciljan Skjelbred, Norwegian footballer
  1987   – Christian Tshimanga Kabeya, Belgian footballer
1988 – Keshia Chanté, Canadian singer
  1988   – Jermaine Gresham, American football player
1989 – Odion Ighalo, Nigerian footballer
1990 – John Newman, English musician, singer, songwriter and record producer
1991 – Joe McElderry, English singer-songwriter
1991 – Siya Kolisi, South African rugby player
  1991   – Matt Moylan, Australian rugby league player
1992 – Vladimir Morozov, Russian swimmer
1993 – Park Bo-gum, South Korean actor
  1993   – Gnash, American singer, songwriter, rapper, DJ and record producer
1994 – Grete-Lilijane Küppas, Estonian footballer
  1994   – Rezar, Albanian professional wrestler
1995 – Euan Aitken, Australian rugby league player
  1995   – Akira Ioane, New Zealand rugby Union player
  1995   – Joseph Schooling, Singaporean swimmer
  1995   – Ki Hui-hyeon, South Korean singer-songwriter and actress
  1998 – Karman Thandi, Indian tennis player
  2000 – Bianca Andreescu, Canadian tennis player
2002 – Sam Walker, English-Australian rugby league player
2003 – Anna Cathcart, Canadian actress

Deaths

Pre-1600
 840 – Rorgon I, Frankish nobleman (or 839)
 924 – Li Cunshen, general of Later Tang (b. 862)
 956 – Hugh the Great, Frankish nobleman (b. 898)
1185 – Richeza of Poland, queen of León (b. c. 1140)
1286 – Hugh de Balsham, English bishop
1332 – Adam de Brome, founder of Oriel College, Oxford
1361 – Johannes Tauler, German mystic theologian
1397 – Philip of Artois, Count of Eu, French soldier (b. 1358)
1424 – Johannes Ambundii, archbishop of Riga
1468 – Jean Le Fèvre de Saint-Remy, Burgundian historian and author (b. 1395)
1487 – John de la Pole, 1st Earl of Lincoln (b. c. 1463)
1540 – Konrad von Thüngen, German nobleman (b. c. 1466)

1601–1900
1622 – Alexander Seton, 1st Earl of Dunfermline, Scottish lawyer, judge, and politician, Lord Chancellor of Scotland (b. 1555)
1626 – Christian, Duke of Brunswick-Lüneburg-Wolfenbüttel, German Protestant military leader (b. 1599)
1666 – Sir Richard Fanshawe, 1st Baronet, English poet and diplomat, English Ambassador to Spain (b. 1608)
1674 – Tomás Yepes, Spanish painter (b. 1595 or 1600)
1722 – John Churchill, 1st Duke of Marlborough, English general and politician, Lord Lieutenant of Oxfordshire (b. 1650)
1743 – Louise-Françoise de Bourbon, eldest daughter of King Louis XIV of France (b. 1673)
1752 – Joseph Butler, English bishop and philosopher (b. 1692)
1762 – Anne Russell, Countess of Jersey (formerly Duchess of Bedford) (b. c.1705)
1777 – Jean-Baptiste-Louis Gresset, French poet and playwright (b. 1709)
1779 – Sir Francis Bernard, 1st Baronet, English lawyer and politician, Governor of the Province of Massachusetts Bay (b. 1712)
1804 – Johann Adam Hiller, German composer and conductor (b. 1728)
1824 – Charles-François Lebrun, duc de Plaisance, French lawyer and politician (b. 1739)
1849 – Wilhelm Martin Leberecht de Wette, German theologian and scholar (b. 1780)
1850 – William Lawson, English-Australian explorer and politician (b. 1774)
1858 – John Snow, English epidemiologist and physician (b. 1813)
1862 – Hidenoyama Raigorō, Japanese sumo wrestler, the 9th Yokozuna (b. 1808)
1869 – Charles Sturt, Indian-English botanist and explorer (b. 1795)
1872 – Norman MacLeod, Scottish minister and author (b. 1812)
1878 – Crawford Long, American surgeon and pharmacist (b. 1815)
  1878   – Kikuchi Yōsai, Japanese painter (b. 1781)
1881 – Josiah Mason, English businessman and philanthropist (b. 1795)
1885 – Wilhelm Camphausen, German painter and academic (b. 1818)
1886 – Alexander Stuart, Scottish-Australian politician, 9th Premier of New South Wales (b. 1824)

1901–present
1902 – Ernst Schröder, German mathematician and academic (b. 1841)
1918 – Bazil Assan, Romanian engineer and explorer (b. 1860)
1925 – Chittaranjan Das, Indian lawyer and politician (b. 1870)
1929 – Bramwell Booth, English 2nd General of The Salvation Army (b. 1856)
  1929   – Vernon Louis Parrington, American historian and scholar (b. 1871)
1930 – Ezra Fitch, American lawyer and businessman, co-founded Abercrombie & Fitch (b. 1866)
  1930   – Elmer Ambrose Sperry, American inventor, co-invented the gyrocompass (b. 1860)
1939 – Chick Webb, American drummer and bandleader (b. 1905)
1940 – DuBose Heyward, American author (b. 1885)
1944 – Marc Bloch, French historian and academic (b. 1886)
1945 – Aris Velouchiotis, Greek general (b. 1905)
1946 – Gordon Brewster, Irish cartoonist (b 1889)
1952 – Andrew Lawson, Scottish-American geologist and academic (b. 1861)
1953 – Margaret Bondfield, English politician, Secretary of State for Work and Pensions (b. 1873)
1955 – Ozias Leduc, Canadian painter (b. 1864)
1958 – Pál Maléter, Hungarian general and politician, Minister of Defence of Hungary (b. 1917)
  1958   – Imre Nagy, Hungarian politician, 3rd Prime Minister of Hungary (b. 1895) 
1959 – George Reeves, American actor and director (b. 1914)
1961 – Marcel Junod, Swiss physician and anesthesiologist (b. 1904)
1967 – Reginald Denny, English actor (b. 1891)
1969 – Harold Alexander, 1st Earl Alexander of Tunis, English field marshal and politician, 17th Governor General of Canada (b. 1891)
1970 – Sydney Chapman, English mathematician and geophysicist (b. 1888)
  1970   – Brian Piccolo, American football player (b. 1943)
1971 – John Reith, 1st Baron Reith, Scottish broadcaster, co-founded BBC (b. 1889)
1974 – Amalie Sara Colquhoun, Australian landscape and portrait painter (b. 1894)
1977 – Wernher von Braun, German-American physicist and engineer (b. 1912)
1979 – Ignatius Kutu Acheampong, Ghanaian general and politician, 6th Head of state of Ghana (b. 1931)
  1979   – Nicholas Ray, American actor, director, and screenwriter (b. 1911)
1981 – Thomas Playford IV, Australian politician, 33rd Premier of South Australia (b. 1896)
1982 – James Honeyman-Scott, English guitarist and songwriter (b. 1956)
1984 – Lew Andreas, American football player and coach (b. 1895)
  1984   – Erni Krusten, Estonian author and poet (b. 1900)
1986 – Maurice Duruflé, French organist and composer (b. 1902)
1987 – Marguerite de Angeli, American author and illustrator (b. 1889)
1988 – Miguel Piñero, Puerto Rican-American actor and playwright (b. 1946)
1993 – Lindsay Hassett, Australian cricketer and soldier (b. 1913)
1994 – Kristen Pfaff, American bass player and songwriter  (b. 1967)
1996 – Mel Allen, American sportscaster and game show host (b. 1913)
1998 – Fred Wacker, American race car driver and engineer (b. 1918)
1999 – Screaming Lord Sutch, English singer and activist (b. 1940)
2003 – Pierre Bourgault, Canadian journalist and politician (b. 1934)
  2003   – Georg Henrik von Wright, Finnish–Swedish philosopher and author (b. 1916)
2004 – Thanom Kittikachorn, Thai field marshal and politician, 10th Prime Minister of Thailand (b. 1911)
  2004   – Jacques Miquelon, Canadian lawyer and judge (b. 1911)
2005 – Enrique Laguerre, Puerto Rican-American author and critic (b. 1906)
2008 – Mario Rigoni Stern, Italian soldier and author (b. 1921)
2010 – Marc Bazin, Haitian lawyer and politician, 49th President of Haiti (b. 1932)
  2010   – Maureen Forrester, Canadian singer and academic (b. 1930)
  2010   – Ronald Neame, English director, producer, cinematographer, and screenwriter (b. 1911)
2011 – Östen Mäkitalo, Swedish engineer and academic (b. 1938)
2012 – Nils Karlsson, Swedish skier (b. 1917)
  2012   – Jorge Lankenau, Mexican banker and businessman (b. 1944)
  2012   – Sławomir Petelicki, Polish general (b. 1946)
  2012   – Susan Tyrrell, American actress (b. 1945) 
2013 – Sam Farber, American businessman, co-founded OXO (b. 1924)
  2013   – Hans Hass, Austrian biologist and diver (b. 1919)
  2013   – Khondakar Ashraf Hossain, Bangladesh poet and academic (b. 1950)
  2013   – Norman Ian MacKenzie, English journalist and author (b. 1921)
  2013   – Ottmar Walter, German footballer (b. 1924)
2014 – Tony Gwynn, American baseball player and coach (b. 1960)
  2014   – Cándido Muatetema Rivas (b. 1960), Equatoguinean politician and diplomat, Prime Minister of Equatorial Guinea
2015 – Charles Correa, Indian architect and urban planner (b. 1930)
  2015   – Jean Vautrin, French director, screenwriter, and critic (b. 1933)
2016 – Jo Cox, English political activist and MP (b. 1974)
2017 – Helmut Kohl, German politician, Chancellor of Germany (b. 1930)
2020 – Eduardo Cojuangco Jr., Filipino businessman and politician (b. 1935)

Holidays and observances
Birthday of Leonard P. Howell (Rastafari) 
 Bloomsday (Dublin, Ireland)
 Christian feast days:
 Aurelianus of Arles
 Aureus of Mainz (and his sister Justina)
 Benno
 Cettin of Oran
 Curig of Llanbadarn
 Ferreolus and Ferrutio
 George Berkeley and Joseph Butler (Episcopal Church)
 June 16 (Eastern Orthodox liturgics)
 Lutgardis
 Quriaqos and Julietta
 Engineer's Day (Argentina)
 Father's Day (Seychelles)
 International Day of the African Child (Organisation of African Unity)
 Martyrdom of Guru Arjan Dev (Sikhism)
 Sussex Day (Sussex)
 Youth Day (South Africa)

References

External links

 
 
 

Days of the year
June